The Pensacola class was a class of United States Navy heavy cruiser, the first "treaty cruisers" designed under the limitations set by the Washington Naval Treaty, which limited cruisers to a maximum of  displacement and a maximum main battery caliber of .

Description

This was inadequate to protect her vitals from enemy 8-inch shells and was no thicker than the armor on  gun cruisers.

Their main armament consisted of ten 8-inch guns, in two twin turrets on the main deck, and two triple turrets two decks above, making it one of the two US Navy ship classes (besides the s) to have different-sized turrets for main armament. All the guns in each turret were mounted in a single slide, and were unable to elevate independently of each other. Also, unlike the very few other ships with different sized main battery turrets (Nevada-class battleships and King George V-class battleships) the Pensacolas had the larger turrets superfiring over the smaller turrets, whereas the others had the larger turrets on "bottom". Placing heavier turrets above lighter ones allows for finer lines for a given length, however this causes top heaviness and reduces stability.

Unfortunately, because of the rather unusual main battery layout and their heavy tripod fore-masts, they were top-heavy and prone to excessive rolling. This combined with low freeboard forward made them inferior seaboats compared to later designs. Rework in the shipyards modified the hull and superstructure in the 1930s to eliminate the rolling.

The Navy built only two ships in this class before switching to the  design. Many of the deficiencies of the Pensacolas were corrected by reducing the main battery to three triple turrets (two forward, one aft) and adding another upper deck forward of amidships.

Ships in class

See also
County-class cruiser, a contemporary class of RN cruisers built to the same Treaty limits
Furutaka-class cruiser, a contemporary class of IJN cruisers built to the same Treaty limits
List of cruisers of the United States Navy

References

External links

Global Security.org – Pensacola-class cruiser
Global Security.org – Pensacola-class cruiser specifications

Cruiser classes